Lightyear is a 2022 American computer-animated science-fiction action-adventure film produced by Walt Disney Pictures and Pixar Animation Studios, and distributed by Walt Disney Studios Motion Pictures. The film is a spin-off of the Toy Story film series, but does not take place in the same fictional universe as them; rather, it is presented as a film that some of the characters in the main Toy Story films have seen. Lightyear centers on the character Buzz Lightyear, who in this film is human and not a toy. The film was directed by Angus MacLane (in his feature directorial debut) and produced by Galyn Susman, from a screenplay and story written by MacLane and Jason Headley, both of whom co-wrote the latter with Matthew Aldrich. It stars Chris Evans as the voice of the titular character, with Keke Palmer, Peter Sohn, Taika Waititi, Dale Soules, James Brolin, and Uzo Aduba in supporting roles. The film follows Buzz Lightyear (Evans) operating as a space ranger who, after being marooned on a hostile planet with his commander and crew, tries to find a way back home while encountering a threat to the universe's safety.

The concept of a human Buzz Lightyear, who exists in a fictional universe within a fictional universe, was first introduced in the 2000 direct-to-video film Buzz Lightyear of Star Command: The Adventure Begins, which was then used as the pilot to the TV series Buzz Lightyear of Star Command (2000–2001). MacLane, an avid science-fiction fan, pitched the idea of a film featuring Buzz Lightyear at Pixar, after finishing work on Finding Dory (2016). The project was officially announced in an investor meeting held by Disney in December 2020. The animators gave the film a "cinematic" and "chunky" look, evoking the science-fiction films MacLane grew up watching. To design the vehicles of the film, MacLane used Lego pieces to build various ships and pitch them to the designers and artists. The team had brought two sets of lenses, two cameras, and a larger sensor equivalent to 65 millimeters, a procedure earlier initiated by Pixar in WALL-E (2008). Development on Lightyear lasted for five and a half years, on an approximate $200 million budget. Michael Giacchino composed the film's score, while Ren Klyce served as its sound designer.

Lightyear premiered at the El Capitan Theatre in Los Angeles on June 8, 2022, and was theatrically released in the United States on June 17, in RealD 3D, 4DX, Dolby Cinema, and IMAX formats. It became the first Pixar film to be released in theaters worldwide since Onward in March 2020, and the first to include scenes specifically formatted for IMAX theaters. The film was a box-office bomb, grossing $226 million worldwide against a $200 million production budget before marketing and distribution costs. It received generally positive reviews from critics, with praise for its animation, score, visuals, technical aspects, and entertainment value, but criticism for its screenplay.

Plot 

A Star Command exploration vessel changes course to investigate signs of life on the unknown world T'Kani Prime. Woken from hibernation, Space Ranger Buzz Lightyear and his commanding officer and best friend Alisha Hawthorne scout the landing site. Attacked by hostile insect and plant-like lifeforms, they attempt to take off, but Buzz inadvertently causes the ship to crash despite his best efforts. Blaming himself for stranding the crew, Buzz volunteers as the test pilot for the hyperspace fuel crystal they will need to develop to return home. One year later, the crew has constructed a new colony to conduct repairs.

Buzz's disastrous first test flight is compounded by the effects of time dilation: for the four minutes he spent in flight, four years have passed on T'Kani Prime. Alisha shares that she is now engaged to a scientist named Kiko. She gifts Buzz Sox, an AI robot therapist with the shape and behaviors of a cat. Buzz decides to conduct further tests with alternate fuel mixtures, with Alisha's reluctant approval. After many failed tests, each taking place during years of time on the colony, Buzz discovers that Alisha has died of old age, leaving behind a recording where she wishes Buzz goodbye and introduces him to her granddaughter Izzy. Her successor, Commander Cal Burnside, informs Buzz that the colony has given up attempting to regain lightspeed capability and has decided to live on the planet permanently, relying on a laser shield to protect them. Sox reveals that after six decades of work he found a stable formula for the fuel. When Star Command sends personnel to decommission Sox, Buzz escapes with him and defies Burnside's orders to conduct one final test.

With Sox's help, Buzz successfully achieves hyperspeed. However, he skips another 22 years into the future, where he meets a grown-up Izzy. She explains that the colony is under attack from an army of mysterious robots. She and two other cadets, Mo and Darby, intend to destroy a large cruiser that the robots descend from. After an encounter with one of the robots, Buzz realizes the group's inexperience and vows to carry out their mission himself, but they accidentally join him. Buzz and the cadets escape from a nest of insects and investigate a mining facility to repair their ship; beginning to appreciate their help, he allows Izzy, Mo, and Darby to finish the mission with him and Sox.

However, Zurg, the robots' commander, intervenes and captures Buzz. Zurg reveals himself to be an older version of Buzz from the original timeline, which split upon Buzz's return to the planet after the successful hyperspace test: without the robot army to detain them, soldiers from the colony attempted to arrest Buzz under Burnside's orders, forcing the original Buzz to flee into space. This Buzz and his Sox escaped at full speed and, via time dilation, flew hundreds of years into the far future, where he encountered extremely advanced technology. The original Buzz eventually developed a way to travel back in time to prevent himself from stranding the Star Command crew upon the planet. Having worn out his own fuel, Zurg needs fresh fuel to travel further into the past and complete his mission, so he requests it from his younger self. Realizing this would erase Alisha and Kiko's life together, along with Izzy and the lives of all the other colonists, Buzz refuses.

Aided by the original Sox, Buzz and the cadets escape Zurg's ship and set it to self-destruct. On their return to the planet via a crash landing, Zurg attacks and takes the fuel for himself. Buzz is forced to shoot the fuel, causing an explosion that seemingly kills Zurg. With the fuel gone, Buzz finally accepts T'Kani Prime as his home. Burnside arrests the group with the intention of detaining them for their reckless actions, but relents in light of Buzz's bravery against the robot armada. Allowed to revive the Space Ranger Corps, Buzz unexpectedly selects Izzy, Mo, Darby, and Sox as his trainees. With a new fuel crystal created using the computer left behind during the mutiny, Buzz and his team embark on a new adventure.

In a post-credits scene, Zurg floats in space, alive.

Voice cast 

 Chris Evans as Buzz Lightyear, a young test pilot and Space Ranger who explores the uncharted planet called T'Kani Prime.
 Keke Palmer as Izzy Hawthorne, Alisha's granddaughter who fights in the colony's defense forces with Buzz against Zurg.
 Keira Hairston as a young version of Izzy.
 Peter Sohn as Sox, a robotic cat who acts as Buzz's companion.
 Sohn also voices an older, worn-out version of Sox used by Zurg.
 Taika Waititi as Mo Morrison, a fresh, naive recruit in the colonial defense forces
 Dale Soules as Darby Steel, an elderly convict who volunteers in the colonial defense forces in return for a reduced sentence.
 James Brolin as Buzz Lightyear / Zurg, the commander of the invading robotic army who is later revealed to be an elderly, nihilistic version of himself from an alternate timeline.
 Uzo Aduba as Alisha Hawthorne, Buzz's best friend and commanding officer, who is one of Izzy's grandmothers.
 Mary McDonald-Lewis as I.V.A.N., a voice-activated virtual assistant.
 Isiah Whitlock Jr. as Commander Calvin "Cal" Burnside, the officer who succeeds Alisha Hawthorne.
 Angus MacLane as ERIC, DERIC, and the Zyclops.
 Bill Hader as Benny Featheringhamstan / The Rookie, a new recruit partnered with Buzz and Alisha. Hader previously voiced Axel the Carnie in Toy Story 4 (2019).
 Efren Ramirez as Airman Diaz, an acquaintance of Buzz.

Additionally, Tim Peake appears in an uncredited cameo as a worker at the mission control center.

Production

Development 

Development on Lightyear started after finishing work on Finding Dory (2016). After co-directing Finding Dory with Andrew Stanton, Angus MacLane was allowed to pitch the idea of making a Buzz Lightyear film, having always wondered what movie Andy Davis saw in the original Toy Story (1995) to get interested in a Buzz Lightyear action figure. MacLane, a science fiction fan, had felt attracted to the character of Buzz since he started working at Pixar, feeling that the film's story was very "personal" for him, whose favorite movie since childhood had been Star Wars (1977). An aspect present in the Toy Story films that Lightyear explores is Buzz's disagreement over the nature of reality, which, coupled with his heroic ideals, made an amalgam of sci-fi clichés that MacLane intended to make more than just a punchline.

In February 2019, Tim Allen, who voiced Buzz in the films, expressed interest in doing another film as he "did not see any reason why they would not do it", while in that May, on The Ellen DeGeneres Show, Tom Hanks, who voiced Sheriff Woody, said that Toy Story 4 (2019) would be the final installment in the franchise, but producer Mark Nielsen disclosed a possibility of a fifth film, as Pixar was not ruling out that possibility. In December 2020 at a Disney Investor Day meeting, Lightyear was announced as a spin-off film depicting the in-universe origin of the human Buzz Lightyear character, with Chris Evans providing the character's voice.

When asked about the relationship between Lightyear and Buzz Lightyear of Star Command, a Toy Story spin-off series that also serves as an in-universe production starring the Buzz character, MacLane, who directed the CG opening sequence for Star Command, said that he did not have it in mind while working on the film, but always pictured the series being developed in-universe after a trilogy of Lightyear films. He later explained that Lightyear serves as a "live-action" film within the Toy Story universe, whereas Star Command serves as a hand-drawn animated series based on the film, from which the toy versions of Buzz and Zurg derive. On May 4, 2022, production of Lightyear was completed after spending five and a half years in development. The budget was approximately $200 million.

Casting 

Producer Galyn Susman said that the creative team did not discuss bringing back the original voice actor for Buzz Lightyear, Tim Allen, in any capacity for this film because they believed that his voice would have tied the film too closely to Toy Story when the film aims to be its own stand-alone story while also saying: "Tim really is the embodiment of the toy Buzz, and this isn't the toy world, so it really doesn't make sense. There's not really a role. It would just cause more confusion for audiences instead of helping them understand the movie we're trying to tell." Chris Evans was announced as the voice of the human Buzz Lightyear along with the project's announcement in December 2020. Evans was the first and only choice MacLane had for Buzz; MacLane defended the recasting as follows:

Evans visited Pixar's offices one day and they pitched him the project during a visit; he accepted the offer immediately, given his love for animation. Evans credited Tim Allen as his guideline and also wanted to "create his own understanding of the character, and try to make some fresh tracks in the snow while paying homage to his work in the film". He eventually felt comfortable with his own interpretation and had to lower his voice for the role.

Keke Palmer, Dale Soules, Uzo Aduba, James Brolin, Mary McDonald-Lewis, Efren Ramirez and Isiah Whitlock Jr. were reported to have been cast in supporting roles in February 2022, following the release of the official trailer. On May 6, 2022, European Space Agency astronaut Tim Peake was revealed to have a cameo as "Tim from Mission Control". On May 25, it was revealed that Formula One drivers Carlos Sainz Jr. and Charles Leclerc would cameo in the film; both playing the same undisclosed character for the Spanish and Italian dubs of the film, respectively.

Animation and design 
The animators wanted the film to look "cinematic" and "chunky" in order to evoke the feeling of the science fiction films MacLane grew up with. In order to achieve this, they asked a former Industrial Light & Magic employee to build a spaceship model for them, from which the animators drew inspiration; this technique was inspired by designers for early science fiction films using models as inspiration for their sets and props. MacLane said the animation took several "visual lessons" from early science fiction and space opera films such as those of the Star Wars franchise, though without intentionally imitating such films. Perception helped with the opening and end credits of the film. To design the vehicles of the film, MacLane used Lego pieces to build various ships such as the Armadillo and pitch them to the designers and artists to match the chunky feel within the film. Originally, like Lego films, the world sets within the film via design and concept art. However, for the film, this is the first Pixar film to use Lego as part of their pipeline than what Lego does. MacLane already made a Lego design for WALL-E for the Lego Ideas set. Zurg was redesigned for the film, influenced by anime robots, to look more grounded and menacing than his previous appearances which MacLane believed were too comical.

Korean animators Chun Sung-uk and Lee Chae-yeon worked on the animation process in their homes during the COVID-19 pandemic. They said that it is "overwhelming to see the full scale of what computer animation can do on the big screen". The animation team went to NASA to research about spaceships, space suits and overall set pieces as they wanted "everything to look like a live-action film rather than an animation". According to Lee, a 3D animator, who also worked on Toy Story 2 and 3, said "The director wanted to make a film that felt true so he asked for a much more toned-down version of Buzz's personality. Being part of the team required an enormous amount of responsibility, but it was really exciting for me professionally".

For the IMAX release, Lightyear is the first ever animated feature film to have its aspect ratio opened up from 2.39:1 to 1.43:1 for select sequences of the film. Jane Yen, who served as the film's visual effects supervisor, spoke to /Film stating that the team had developed virtual IMAX cameras to shoot the sequences in 1.43:1 and then would be cropped to standard-definition. The team had brought two sets of lenses, two cameras, and a larger sensor equivalent to 65 millimeters, which was earlier initiated by Pixar in WALL-E (2008).

Music 

Recurrent Pixar composer Michael Giacchino was announced to compose the score for the film, marking his eighth collaboration with the studio and the second time he would score an installment to a film franchise from Pixar that is traditionally scored by Randy Newman, after Cars 2. He earlier scored for the Toy Story television specials: Toy Story of Terror! (2013) and Toy Story That Time Forgot (2014), the former was written and directed by MacLane.

Marketing 
Following the announcement of the film, a first look was shown at the Disney Investor Day on December 10, 2020. The marketing campaign for Lightyear began on October 27, 2021, with the release of a teaser trailer, set to David Bowie's "Starman", that received 83 million views in its first 24 hours. Compared to other Pixar films, the teaser's viewership ranks second behind a teaser for Incredibles 2 (114 million). It was positively reviewed by commentators, with CNN-based editor Leah Asmelash writing, "the trailer filled many millennials with sentimentality". The first trailer was released online on February 8, 2022, and was then aired at Super Bowl LVI on February 13, 2022. Comicbook.com's Aaron Perine opined that "the animated movie will be as comedic as expected of these family movies" and further stated "Chris Evans' version of the Space Ranger takes shape as he gets used to some alien surroundings. Also of note would be Lightyear's new companion, a robot cat that will also end up being comedic relief played by Peter Sohn." Aaron Couch of The Hollywood Reporter had stated "The Lightyear trailer reveals that Buzz is sent on a rescue flight after he and a group of people are stranded on a planet. After a year of hard work, they've managed to send Buzz off world for help."

On April 27, 2022, the first 30 minutes of the film was premiered at CinemaCon along with the second trailer, which released online six days earlier. It was positively received by critics, who referred to the film as "Pixar's Star Wars" and a "beautifully animated, fun, and emotional journey", and appreciated the cinematic qualities, including animation and visuals. Critics further went on to praise the robotic cat Sox (voiced by Peter Sohn), and called it "the standout performer." CNBC's Sarah Whitten compared Sox, with K-2SO of Rogue One and Baymax from Big Hero 6, attributing the character with a "dry sense of humor and blunt vocal delivery and also an innocence and caring nature". On May 5, 2022, a poster, stills from the film, and a "special look" trailer was released online.

Fandango Media's managing editor Erik Davis, and John Rocha, film critic for Outlaw Nation, predicted a demand for Sox toys, even before the film's release. Mattel, which had the master toy license for Toy Story franchise, had announced a new Lightyear toy line consisting of action figures, playsets and vehicles. After Sox's character in the film received praise from insiders, Mattel created "an animatronic interactive version" which costs $80, apart from the plush and action figures. Mattel's executive lead, PJ Lewis had said "We knew he was much more than a sidekick and offered multiple ways to drive product innovation for the 'Lightyear' line. Plus, we have a few cat people on the team who were smitten."

Lego released three sets based on scenes from the film, which were released April 24, 2022. On May 29, 2022, Ferrari announced that Lightyear would be a sponsor on their cars starting at the 2022 Monaco Grand Prix. In addition, Charles Leclerc and Carlos Sainz Jr. would also be cast for roles in the film, respectively voicing for the Italian and Spanish versions. American food manufacturing company Lightlife, collaborated with Disney and Pixar for launching several food packages inspired from the film. It also planned for a sweepstake promotion, which enable customers to win several prizes, including private film screening and Disney merchandises. Singapore-based WE Cinemas announced the debut of "Lightyear Premium Pack" with refreshments marketed with stills and images from the film. A half-hour-long documentary featurette entitled Beyond Infinity: Buzz and the Journey to Lightyear was released on the Disney+ streaming service on June 10 in anticipation of the film's release, chronicling the conception and production of Lightyear.

Release

Theatrical 
Lightyear had its world premiere at the El Capitan Theatre on June 8, 2022, and was theatrically released in the United States on June 17, 2022, by Walt Disney Studios Motion Pictures in RealD 3D, 4DX, Dolby Cinema, and IMAX formats. It is Pixar's first film since Onward (2020) to receive a theatrical release after Soul (2020), Luca (2021), and Turning Red (2022) were assigned direct-to-streaming releases on Disney+ in response to the closure of cinemas due to the COVID-19 pandemic. Lightyear also became Pixar's first film to have virtual IMAX cameras in its progress.

Ban and censorship
Despite being released internationally in the United Kingdom (Cineworld), Japan (Toho Cinemas), India (AMC Theatres India), France (Le Péniche Cinéma), Germany (Cinemagic), New Zealand (Event Cinemas), South Africa (Ster-Kinekor and Nu Metro) and Australia (Event Cinemas and Village Cinemas) in RealD 3D, IMAX, 4DX, Dolby Cinema and D-BOX formats, Lightyear was banned in the Muslim world (including Bahrain, Brunei, Egypt, Iraq, Jordan, Kazakhstan, Kuwait, Lebanon, Malaysia, Oman, Palestine, Qatar, Saudi Arabia, Syria, Tunisia and the United Arab Emirates) due to a scene featuring a same-sex kiss between Uzo Aduba's female character Alisha Hawthorne and her partner Kiko. The People's Republic of China (PRC) also requested that the scene in question be removed; however Disney declined to make the cuts. Indonesia stated that they did not ban the film, "but suggested the owner of the movie think about their audience in Indonesia where an LGBT kissing scene is still considered sensitive." In Singapore, the scene resulted in the film being allowed only for people above 16 years of age. Despite bans across most of the Arab World, Morocco refused to ban the film and even showed it in cinemas, despite a petition requesting a ban on the film.

The specific scene was initially cut from the film in mid-March 2022, but following Disney CEO Bob Chapek's response to Florida's Parental Rights in Education bill and the internal polarizing uproar it caused within Disney, the scene was reinstated. Speaking to Variety's Angelique Jackson, Evans had stated about the scene saying: "I've been asked the question a few times — it's nice, and it's wonderful, it makes me happy. It's tough to not be a little frustrated that it even has to be a topic of discussion [...] The goal is that we can get to a point where it is the norm, and that this doesn't have to be some uncharted waters, that eventually this is just the way it is. That representation across the board is how we make films."

Home media 
Lightyear was made available on Disney+ on August 3, 2022, with the option to view the theatrical version of the film or the IMAX Enhanced version. The film was also released on Disney+ Hotstar in Indonesia and Malaysia as the film did not release theatrically in these territories following the demand of removing the same-sex kiss. The movie was released under the ratings of 18+ for Malaysia and 21+  for Indonesia (both Indonesian and Malaysian equivalents of the adults-only NC-17), with mature content warning included prior to the start of the film. IGN Southeast Asia also confirmed that the same-sex relationship remained untouched, even for the previously mentioned same-sex kiss. Disney+ in the Middle East did not include the film as they decided to align with local censorship rules, meaning that content aimed at children that include LGBTQIA+ references, including this film, will not be released in these territories.

It was streamed by 1.7 million U.S. households during its first five days on Disney+ according to Samba TV. According to Nielsen, it was viewed for 1.3 billion minutes and ranked third overall in streaming titles for the week. Its viewership fell sharply in the second week to 700 million minutes, with the film being positioned tenth overall and third among all streaming films.

Walt Disney Studios Home Entertainment released Lightyear on Ultra HD Blu-ray, DVD and Blu-ray on September 13, 2022.

Reception

Streaming viewership 
According to Whip Media, Lightyear was the 2nd most watched movie in the United States across all platforms, during the week of August 5, 2022 to August 7, 2022. According to the streaming aggregator Reelgood, Lightyear was the 10th most watched program across all platforms, during the week of August 12, 2022. According to Nielsen Holdings, Lightyear was the 9th most streamed movie across all platforms, during the week of August 29, 2022 to September 4, 2022.

Lightyear was the most watched movie worldwide on Disney+ in August 2022. It was on the number one spot on the platform for 35 days consecutively.

Box office 
Lightyear grossed $118.3 million in the United States and Canada, and $108.1 million in other territories, for a worldwide total of $226.4 million. It was the fourth highest-grossing animated film of 2022 in the U.S. and the fifth worldwide.

In the United States and Canada, Lightyear was projected to gross $70–85 million from 4,255 theaters in its opening weekend, with some estimates reaching as high as $105 million. However, after making just $20.7 million on its first day (including $5.2 million from Thursday night previews), estimates were lowered to $51–55 million. It went on to debut to $50.6 million, finishing second behind holdover Jurassic World Dominion. Additionally, the film earned $34.6 million from 43 international markets, bringing its worldwide three-day debut to $85.2 million. In its second weekend, Lightyear declined 64.1% to $18.2 million, the second-worst sophomore drop for a Pixar film after Onward (73%), which opened at the onset of the pandemic.

Both Deadline Hollywood and Variety attributed the performance to competition from Jurassic World Dominion and Top Gun: Maverick, though ultimately noted it as a disappointment given the brand strength of both Pixar and the Toy Story franchise. Los Angeles Times writer Ryan Faughnder believed that the film was at a disadvantage, since, as a spin-off film, it did not have well-known Toy Story characters such as Woody. He also noted that spin-offs tend to not gross as much as the main franchise installments, and compared the film to the spin-off films Solo: A Star Wars Story and Fast & Furious Presents: Hobbs & Shaw. Pamela McClintock of The Hollywood Reporter wrote that, in addition to competition from Jurassic World Dominion and Top Gun: Maverick, the lackluster opening was attributed to brand confusion in the film's marketing. McClintock, Martha Ross of The Mercury News, and The Washington Posts Sonny Bunch also questioned if the response from people over the inclusion of a lesbian couple kissing and the decision not to cast Tim Allen in the part of Buzz Lightyear was to blame for the film's underwhelming opening. Other box office analysts believed family audiences might have not shown up to theaters after becoming accustomed to the availability of Pixar films at home after their three previous films, Soul, Luca, and Turning Red, were released directly to Disney+ during the pandemic. Some box-office analysts theorized that family audiences were reluctant to attend theaters in general due to COVID-19 concerns, although this was disproven after Minions: The Rise of Gru opened to $107 million in the U.S. and Canada two weeks later.

Critical response 

 It is the lowest rated film of the Toy Story franchise on Rotten Tomatoes.  Audiences polled by CinemaScore gave the film an average grade of "A–" on an A+ to F scale, while those at PostTrak gave it an overall positive score of 85% (including an average 4 out of 5 stars), with 62% saying they would definitely recommend it.

Peter Bradshaw's four-star review for The Guardian stated "This cracking origin story for Toy Story's spaceman hero is fun and clever and reminds us why we loved Pixar in the first place." David Rooney of The Hollywood Reporter called it "a funny spinoff with suspense and heart, a captivatingly spirited toon take on splashy live-action retro popcorn entertainment." Emma Stefansky of Thrillist said "There's plenty in Lightyear to enjoy, and it's one of Pixar's better efforts over the last 10 years, but it ultimately feels half-done. It feels like it ought to be the beginning of something, like its narrative is a prologue stretched into a feature awaiting the much more interesting second and third and fifth installments down the road." RogerEbert.com-based critic Odie Henderson praised the score who called it as "one of Giacchino's best scores" and "a delectable spoof of bombastic space movie music that elevates every scene it plays under". Valerie Complex of Deadline Hollywood stated "Lightyear does not rely too much on Toy Story lore to build its world, but it would have benefited from showing some connection to that part of the franchise instead of using title cards." She further praised the technical aspects and wrote "The animation is gorgeous and hyper-realistic. The art department put their all into designing this universe and its characters and robotic villains," but criticized the screenplay saying "sometimes the story becomes convoluted and drags on, almost like there was a need to pad the runtime, causing Lightyear to get into even more trouble and creating a never-ending slew of trampling obstacles."

Variety's Owen Gleiberman wrote: "Lightyear in its eminently conventional and likable way, is a far less audacious movie than that. For what is surely not the first time, Buzz's I-can-do-anything myopic bravado has failed [...] part of that may be that in the 'Toy Story' films, he is a toy — that's part of the joke, one that Buzz is never quite in on. He thinks he's a real Space Ranger! So when you actually turn Buzz Lightyear into a Space Ranger, you enlarge him and diminish him at the same time." In contrast, BBC's Nicholas Barber wrote "The story is thin, repetitive, and almost entirely dependent on the heroes being clumsy" and gave the film two stars. David Ehrlich of IndieWire wrote "Lightyear remains firmly stuck in the past even as it hurtles toward the future. And while screenwriters Jason Headley and Angus MacLane need that push-pull in order to tell a story about reconciling the lure of nostalgia with the potential for something new, it's hard for a movie to sell us on living in the moment when every scene feels like it's settling for less." Kaleem Aftab of Time Out called the film "a franchise low, Pixar's meta 'Toy Story' spin-off gets lost in space." The film has received criticism from some conservatives, who have argued that the film's scene with a same-sex kiss is inappropriate for children, saying that Disney sexualizes them.

Accolades

See also 
 Buzz Lightyear of Star Command: The Adventure Begins
 Buzz Lightyear of Star Command

References

External links 
 
 

2020s animated superhero films
2020s children's animated films
2020s English-language films
2020s American animated films
2020s teen films
2022 3D films
2022 action adventure films
2022 computer-animated films
2022 directorial debut films
2022 films
2022 LGBT-related films
2022 science fiction action films
3D animated films
4DX films
American 3D films
American action adventure films
American children's animated action films
American children's animated science fiction films
American children's animated space adventure films
American children's animated superhero films
American computer-animated films
American LGBT-related films
American robot films
American science fiction action films
American science fiction adventure films
American space opera films
American teen films
Animated films about extraterrestrial life
Animated films about robots
Animated films about time travel
Animated films set in the future
Buzz Lightyear
Disney controversies
Film spin-offs
Films about astronauts
Films directed by Angus MacLane
Films scored by Michael Giacchino
Films set in outer space
Films set on fictional planets
Films set on spacecraft
Lesbian-related films
LGBT-related animated films
LGBT-related controversies in film
LGBT-related controversies in animation
IMAX films
Pixar animated films
Teen adventure films
Toy Story
Walt Disney Pictures animated films